Comte de Cornouaille (French), Kont Kernev (Breton), or Count of Cornouaille  may refer to:

 Gourmaëlon, Count of Cornouaille (died 914)
 Benoît de Cornouaille (died 1028), see his son Alain Canhiart
 Alain Canhiart (died 1058)
 Hoël II, Duke of Brittany (1031–1084)

See also
 Cornouaille, Brittany, France; a region, former kingdom, and former sovereign county
 Cornwall County (disambiguation)
 Cornouaille (disambiguation)